Two total lunar eclipses occurred in 1996: 

 4 April 1996 lunar eclipse
 27 September 1996 lunar eclipse

See also 
 List of 20th-century lunar eclipses
 Lists of lunar eclipses